Dorsett Vandeventer "Tubby" Graves (November 27, 1886 – January 16, 1960) was a college head coach in baseball, football, and basketball, and a player of football and baseball.

A head coach in three sports, Graves was primarily a baseball coach, and led three college programs for a total of 32 seasons. He began at the University of Alabama for four seasons (1912–1915), spent another four at Texas A&M University (1916–1919), and finished with 24 seasons the University of Washington (1923–1946).

In the sport of football, he was a college head coach for seven seasons: at Alabama (1911–1914), Texas A&M (1918), and the Agricultural College of the State of Montana—now Montana State University (1920–1921), compiling a career record of 32–18–4. In basketball, he served as a head coach for six years: at Alabama (1912–1915), Texas A&M (1915–1916), and Montana Agricultural (1920–1922). At Washington, he was a longtime assistant coach in football and basketball, and later an assistant athletic director.

In the summer of 1912, Graves was the manager of the La Junta Railroaders, a minor league baseball team in La Junta, Colorado of the short-lived Rocky Mountain League.

Early years
Born in Missouri, Graves was one of ten children of a doctor, and his two given names were surnames of two physicians. He played college football at Missouri from 1906 to 1908, and after his eligibility was used up in the Midwest, he moved to the Northwest and played at Idaho on the Palouse for a season in 1909. After college, Graves played baseball in the minor leagues.

Coaching career

Baseball
Graves was the head coach at Alabama, Texas A&M, and Washington, where he led the Huskies in Seattle for 24 seasons (1923–1946). Graves had a long-standing amicable rivalry with Buck Bailey of Washington State, whom he coached in baseball and football at Texas A&M.

Football
After several years of playing baseball in the minors, he coached football at Alabama, Texas A&M, and what is now Montana State. From 1911 to 1914, he led the Alabama program to a 21–12–3 record. In his only season at Texas A&M in 1918, he compiled a 6–1 record. He then served as an assistant coach at Texas A&M in 1919 under head coach Dana X. Bible. At Montana Agricultural in Bozeman, he had a 5–5–1 record over two seasons.  While head coach of the baseball team at Washington, Graves also served as an assistant coach in football to several coaches.

Basketball
Graves was a head basketball coach for six seasons, the first three at Alabama, where he was the program's first coach and compiled a record of 20–12 from 1912 to 1915.  He later headed the Texas A&M program for a season and two at Montana Agricultural. At Washington, he was an assistant coach for 24 seasons under head coach Hec Edmundson. Graves had met Edmundson at Idaho when they were undergraduate athletes, and both were head coaches at Texas A&M in the spring of 1919, Edmundson in track and Graves in baseball.

After coaching
After stepping down as baseball coach at Washington, Graves became an assistant athletic director at the university, where he remained until his death. He was also involved with horse racing in the state as a race steward at Longacres in Renton and Playfair Race Course in Spokane.

Death
While visiting Pullman in the spring of 1959, Graves fell and broke a hip. That December, he was hospitalized in Seattle for treatment of a liver ailment and died several weeks later in January 1960 at age 73. He is buried at Calvary Cemetery in Seattle, about a mile (1.6 km) northeast of the university.

The UW athletic office building (1964) and the two former baseball fields (through 1997) were named for Graves; he was posthumously inducted into the Big W Club, the UW athletics hall of fame, in 1980.

Head coaching record

College football

College baseball

Source:

References

1886 births
1960 deaths
Alabama Crimson Tide athletic directors
Alabama Crimson Tide baseball coaches
Alabama Crimson Tide football coaches
Alabama Crimson Tide men's basketball coaches
American men's basketball coaches
Basketball coaches from Missouri
Idaho Vandals football players
Minor league baseball managers
Missouri Tigers baseball players
Missouri Tigers football players
Montana State Bobcats football coaches
Montana State Bobcats men's basketball coaches
People from Lincoln County, Missouri
Texas A&M Aggies baseball coaches
Texas A&M Aggies football coaches
Texas A&M Aggies men's basketball coaches
Washington Huskies baseball coaches
Washington Huskies football coaches
Washington Huskies men's basketball coaches